Officer Duck is a Donald Duck short film which is produced in Technicolor and released September 22, 1939 by RKO Radio Pictures. This cartoon marked the first appearance of Pete in a Donald Duck series cartoon.

Plot
Police officer Donald Duck is asked to capture a terrible villain named Tiny Tom (Pete).

Donald starts his mission by finding Tom's decrepit house. Donald nervously tells Tom—who is much bigger and stronger than Donald—that he is under arrest. Tom angrily kicks Donald out.

Donald decides to use a different strategy by pretending to be an orphan who was abandoned, and subsequently gains Tom's sympathy. When Tom spots handcuffs in the baby crib, Donald shakes them noisily, convincing Tom that the handcuffs are being used a baby rattle. As Tom continues to play with Donald as if he were a baby, Donald repeatedly tries and fails to steal the gun from Tom's pocket. 

Donald finally manages to handcuff Tom, and then tricks him into giving him the gun by throwing a tantrum. Donald removes his baby costume, revealing his police uniform. An enraged Tom, realizing that he has been tricked, chases Donald, and threatens to rip him into pieces. Luckily for Donald, a large group of police are marching by on parade, blocking the road. Tom turns around, followed by Donald and the rest of the marching police offers. Donald salutes in front of the camera proudly.

Voice cast
 Billy Bletcher as Tiny Tom
 Clarence Nash as Donald Duck

Home media
The short was released on May 18, 2004, on Walt Disney Treasures: The Chronological Donald, Volume One: 1934-1941. The short is also part of the direct-to-video anthology film Once Upon a Halloween.

References

External links

1939 animated films
1939 films
1930s color films
1939 comedy films
Films directed by Clyde Geronimi
Films produced by Walt Disney
1930s Disney animated short films
Films scored by Paul Smith (film and television composer)
Donald Duck short films